Flat Rock is an unincorporated community in Washington Township, Shelby County, in the U.S. state of Indiana.

History
Flat Rock was platted in 1855. It took its name from the Flatrock River. Its post office has operated since 1828.

It had its own high school, Flat Rock High School, which operated from 1893 until its closure in 1958 when the community became part of the Southwestern Consolidated School Corporation of Shelby County.

Geography

References

Unincorporated communities in Shelby County, Indiana
Unincorporated communities in Indiana
Indianapolis metropolitan area